The Ambassador of Australia to Spain is an officer of the Australian Department of Foreign Affairs and Trade and the head of the Embassy of the Commonwealth of Australia to the Kingdom of Spain. The ambassador resides in Madrid. The ambassador also holds non-resident accreditation as ambassador to Andorra (since 1998) and Equatorial Guinea (since 2009).

The current ambassador, since June 2020, is Sophia McIntyre.

List of ambassadors

Notes 
 Also served as non-resident Ambassador of Australia to Andorra, since 1998.
 Also served as non-resident Ambassador of Australia to Equatorial Guinea, since 2009.

References

External links
Australian Embassy, Spain – Andorra and Equatorial Guinea

 
 
 
Spain
Australia
Spanish-Australian culture